Horrid Henry is a British animated television series based on the British children's book series of the same name by Francesca Simon. Produced by Novel Entertainment (in association with Nelvana Limited for series 1 only), it was broadcast from 30 October 2006 until 17 May 2019 on CITV. The show is currently airing on Nickelodeon and Nicktoons and it is currently available to stream on Netflix in the UK since 28 May 2018. 250 episodes were produced. The show has been renewed for a sixth series.

Episodes

Characters and cast

Production and development
The series was first confirmed to be in development as early as March 2004. At Cartoon Forum 2004, 26 episodes would be produced, although no release window was announced at the time.

On 7 May 2008, CITV commissioned a second season for the series.

On 10 February 2011, CITV commissioned a third season.

The series producer is Lucinda Whiteley and the animation director is Dave Unwin. The animation style differs from the Tony Ross illustrations in the books. The series has broadcast in more than 90 countries, including France, United States, Germany, South Africa, India, Pakistan, South Korea, Russia, the Philippines and Australia.

The incidental music is composed by Lester Barnes, and additional songs are composed by Lockdown Media. Three series were aired, with 52 episodes each. The fourth series started on 11 October 2014 with another 52 episodes making it 208 in total.

On 10 May 2018, Nicktoons UK announced they had acquired the broadcast rights to all the seasons of the show, and it premiered on 28 May 2018 on Nicktoons in the UK and Ireland with a special "Horrid Half Term". On the same day, Novel Entertainment ordered 42 new episodes slated to start airing in early 2019. The final episode of series 5 aired on 17 May 2019. Series 5 took the episode count to 250 in total.

Horrid Henry was broadcast on Nicktoons UK in May 2018 and quickly became the channel's most popular show. In 2019, the series was the number three most-watched animation across all the UK's commercial TV services.

CITV lost the rights to the series to Nickelodeon in January 2019, just a few months before the fifth series ended in May that year.

Beginning in 2020, with the successful release of the Horrid Henry's Wild Weekend special, Novel Entertainment announced they would be producing a series of one-hour specials for Netflix, beginning with Horrid Henry's Gross Day Out.

Merchandising
On 11 October 2006, Novel appointed the Copyright Promotions Licensing Group as the British and the European licensing agent for the series.

On 19 May 2009, Novel appointed Stella Projects as the licensing agent for the series in Australia and New Zealand.

Clothing
On 23 July 2007, CPLG appointed Blues Clothing to produce a range a line of nightwear and underwear.

Toyline
A toyline for the series was announced by CPLG in January 2008 for a Fall release window.

Soundtracks
On 17 November 2008, Novel Entertainment signed a record deal with EMI to release Horrid Henry's Most Horrid Album, which consisted of new music from the series which would later be featured in Series 2 of the show and was previously featured in the Live and Horrid Live Show. It was released on 1 December 2008.

In December 2019, Horrid Happy Christmas was released on Spotify and iTunes.

Horrid Henry's Horrid Album was released on 14 January 2020. New tracks including My Song, Born To Be Rude, Wanna Be Me and Too Cool For School featured on the Vue Cinema special and will be released on the album.

Video games
On 27 January 2009, CPLG and Novel Entertainment appointed Asylum Entertainment as the show's video game partner. On 1 June 2009, it was announced that SouthPeak Games would co-publish and distribute the game. The game: Horrid Henry: Missions of Mischief, was released for the Nintendo DS and Wii on 4 December 2009. The game was later released on Microsoft Windows, and altogether sold 100,000 units on all three platforms in the UK.

A second game: Horrid Henry's Horrid Adventure was released in November 2010 for the Nintendo DS.

On 25 November 2011, Asylum and Koch Media released Horrid Henry: The Good, The Bad and the Bugly for the Nintendo 3DS.

On 21 January 2022, P2 Games released Horrid Henry's Krazy Karts for the Nintendo Switch eShop. A Microsoft Windows port was released on 30 June 2022 on Steam.

Apps
In December 2010, Novel announced they would release an IOS application based on the series.

Live show
On 5 June 2008, Novel Entertainment announced a theatrical stage show titled Horrid Henry: Live and Horrid. Produced by Watershed Productions and Sheffield Theatres, the show opened at Lyceum Theatre, Sheffield on 28 August 2008, with previews from 26 August, and ruan at the venue until 13 September. After which, the show toured the UK at locations such as High Wycombe, Bromley, Newcastle, Hull, Liverpool, and Bradford. During Christmas 2008, the show was showcased in London's West End to great fanfare.

In January 2009, it was announced that the show would tour again for the 2009 season due to popular demand during its run. The second run of the show started in Oxford in April before the show travelled to Coventry, Wolverhampton, Nottingham and Cambridge. During the Christmas season that year, the show toured Manchester's Dancehouse

Radio series
During August and December 2009, Horrid Henry took to the airwaves with his own radio show on Fun Kids Radio, hosting a weekly show of comedy and music.

International broadcast
On 22 February 2007, Novel announced that Nelvana Enterprises would distribute the series worldwide except in the UK and Germany. Other than CITV in the UK, RTÉ in Ireland and ZDF in Germany already acquired the rights to the series in the respective countries.

On 19 February 2008, Novel transitioned the show's international distribution to Little Bird Rights. By March, the series was pre-sold to Disney Channel in France, RÚV in Iceland, SVT in Sweden, NRK in Norway and YLE in Finland, with broadcast deals in South Africa, Turkey and Portugal being negotiated. In October 2008, the broadcast rights for the three regions were pre-sold to MNet, Digiturk and RTP respectively, in addition to a Polish deal with Op Art.

In Malta, the series aired on PBS. In the United States it was available for streaming on Netflix until 2023, it is also on Amazon Prime Video, where it is currently available. It also aired on PBS Kids and HBO from 2016. In the Middle East and North Africa, the series has previously aired on M-Net and Disney XD, as of now, it currently airs on Nicktoons. In 2014, Cartoon Network and Boomerang acquired the series for Australia, New Zealand, Pakistan, India, South-East Asia, South Korea and Taiwan. In the MENA region, it is being aired on Jeem TV. In 2018, the series premiered in Canada on Toon-A-Vision.

In Wales, the series was dubbed in Welsh and aired on children's block "Stwnsh" on S4C and was titled "Henri Helynt". In France, the series was dubbed into French under the title "Lucas la Cata" and aired on Disney Channel. In Ireland, the series was dubbed into Irish under the title "Dónal Dána" and aired on TG4. In India, the series was later acquired by Sony YAY! and aired on that channel under the title Haste Raho Henry.

Awards

Horrid Henry: Unlocked!
It was revealed that a podcast entitled Horrid Henry: Unlocked! would be broadcast on Spotify and iTunes every Sunday and was presented by Lizzie Waterworth (as herself and Henry), and children's radio presenter "Silly" Sean Thorne. The series features a variety of fun and games, as well as short stories narrated by the title character. It was revealed that the podcast would have a second series during the Autumn, however, the series was postponed until a later date.

Episodes

 26 April 2020 - do So Fun Run!
 3 May 2020 - Name Game!
 10 May 2020 - The Lost Dog!
 17 May 2020 - The Time Capsule!
 24 May 2020 - Sleepover!
 31 May 2020 - Favourite Day!
 7 June 2020 - The Big Dig!
 14 June 2020 - Champion Chef!
 21 June 2020 - Gone Fishing!
 28 June 2020 - Perfect Peter, Popstar!
 5 July 2020 - Pet Sitting Service!
 12 July 2020 - Smelly Stuff!

See also

Horrid Henry: The Movie
Horrid Henry

References

Notes

Sources

External links
 Official Horrid Henry UK website
 Official Horrid Henry Facebook page
 Official Horrid Henry YouTube page
 Novel Entertainment website
 

Horrid Henry
2006 British television series debuts
2019 British television series endings
2000s British animated television series
2010s British animated television series
2000s British children's television series
2010s British children's television series
Animated television series about children
British children's animated comedy television series
English-language television shows
ITV children's television shows
British television shows based on children's books
Television series about shapeshifting